Kosikha is the name of several rural localities in Russia:
Kosikha, Kontoshinsky Selsoviet, Kosikhinsky District, Altai Krai, a junction in Kontoshinsky Selsoviet of Kosikhinsky District, Altai Krai
Kosikha, Kosikhinsky Selsoviet, Kosikhinsky District, Altai Krai, a selo in Kosikhinsky Selsoviet of Kosikhinsky District, Altai Krai
Kosikha, Kostroma Oblast, a village in Krivyachskoye Settlement of Sharyinsky District, Kostroma Oblast